Villa Castelli is a small town and seat of the General Lamadrid Department  in the Province of La Rioja, northwestern Argentina. As of 2010 it had a population of 1,697.

In March 2015, a helicopter collision in the town killed 10 people, including French athletes Florence Arthaud, Camille Muffat and Alexis Vastine.

References

Populated places in La Rioja Province, Argentina